is a railway station in the town of Aga, Higashikanbara District, Niigata Prefecture, Japan, operated by East Japan Railway Company (JR East).

Lines

Station layout
The station consists of one side platform serving a single bi-directional track. The station is unattended.

History
It was renamed to its present name on 14 March 1985. With the privatization of Japanese National Railways (JNR) on 1 April 1987, the station came under the control of JR East.

Surrounding area
 Aga Mikawa Elementary School
 
 former Mikawa village hall

See also
 List of railway stations in Japan

External links

 JR East station information 

Railway stations in Niigata Prefecture
Ban'etsu West Line
Railway stations in Japan opened in 1913
Aga, Niigata